Peter Plympton Smith (born October 31, 1945) is an American educator and politician who served as a member of the United States House of Representatives from the U.S. state of Vermont, the 76th lieutenant governor of Vermont, and an education administrator. He served as the founding president of the Community College of Vermont, the founding president of California State University, Monterey Bay, and as assistant director general for education of the United Nations Educational, Scientific, and Cultural Organization (UNESCO).

Peter Smith is currently serving as Senior Vice President for Academic Strategies and Development at Kaplan Higher Education Corporation, a global education company owned by the Graham Holding Company. At KHE, he has spearheaded efforts to personalize degree programs and learning support systems, while strengthening their outcomes-based pedagogy at the program and course level. Smith is also developing new market positions and services for the adult postsecondary education market.

Early life and education
Smith was born in Boston, Massachusetts, and was raised in Burlington, Vermont. He is the son of Burlington banker and Vermont State Senator Frederick P. Smith. He graduated from Phillips Academy in 1964 and received an A.B. in history from Princeton University in 1968 after completing a senior thesis titled "Burlington, Vermont, 1791-1848: A Study of Economic Development and Social Change in a Community." In 1970, he received a M.A.T. from the Harvard University Graduate School of Education. He received his Ed.D. from the Harvard Graduate School of Education in administration, planning, and social policy in 1983.

Career in education and politics

Smith served one year as an assistant to the Vermont Commissioner of Education. In 1970, he became the founding president of the Community College of Vermont, a Vermont State College. He first ran for office in 1978, defeating incumbent Lieutenant Governor of Vermont T. Garry Buckley in the Republican primary but losing the general election for Lieutenant Governor to Democrat Madeleine M. Kunin. Between 1981 and 1983, he served as a Vermont State Senator representing the Washington County district. After Kunin chose not to run for re-election in 1982, Smith was elected to succeed her. He served two, two-year terms. He ran for Governor of Vermont in 1986 but was defeated by Kunin. After two years as Vice President of Development at Norwich University he was elected to the United States House of Representatives in 1988 for Vermont's at-large congressional district with 41.2% of the vote. In 1990, he was defeated in his bid for re-election by Independent Bernie Sanders. , he was the last Republican to have represented Vermont in the U.S. House.

Funded by a Mina Shaughnessy Fellowship, Smith wrote Your Hidden Credentials: The Value of Personal Learning Outside College, (Acropolis Books, Ltd, 1986). The book, now out-of-print, promotes college credit for life experience. Smith is also the author of The Quiet Crisis: How Higher Education Is Failing America, (Anker Publishing Company, Inc.,2004) which received juried acclaim from the American Association of Continuing Education. His third book, Harnessing America's Wasted Talent: New Dimensions for Higher Education (Jossey-Bass, 2010) was published in early 2010.  His fourth book, Free-range Learning in the Digital Age: The Emerging Revolution in College, Career, and Education (SelectBooks) was published in 2018.

From 1991 to 1994, Smith served as dean of the Graduate School of Education and Human Development at George Washington University. In 1991, he also served as executive director of the U.S. Commission on Responsibilities for Financing Postsecondary Education. In 1994, due in part to his work in assessment at GWU, the California State University recruited Smith as founding president of California State University, Monterey Bay, a post that he vacated in 2005. Beginning June 20, 2005, Smith served as assistant director general for education of the United Nations Educational, Scientific, and Cultural Organization (UNESCO).

Work at UNESCO

At UNESCO, Smith's education experience was expressed by his concern for the wellbeing of learners: "Quality is an issue," says Smith. "UNESCO has long encouraged the internationalization of education and the involvement of a range of partners, but we must also protect students from inadequate learning resources, low-quality provisions, degree mills and bogus institutions."

After assuming the post of Assistant Director General (ADG) for Education of UNESCO, Smith made several moves based on his mandate from UNESCO's General Conference and from its Director General in an attempt to reform the Education Sector of the institution. These included developing UNESS, a simplified national education support strategy; a Global Action Plan; involvement with the G8 and the World Economic Forum; restructuring the headquarters governance structure; and implementing a de-centralization plan for UNESCO's Education Sector. After an intensive one-year study contracted out to Navigant Consulting, all but three of over 50 recommendations were approved for implementation by the Director General in June 2006.

Political fallout to the approved reforms led to anonymous charges of financial improprieties in the awarding of contracts totaling US$2.2 million to Navigant Consulting without proper UNESCO oversight. Smith was found to have used an established, but alternative bidding procedure in the UNESCO rules. The UNESCO Executive Board ultimately resolved to clarify and strengthen the bidding procedures at UNESCO. In March 2007, opposition to his reforms and the resulting "negative climate" within the organization resulted in Smith receiving a death threat at his Paris home, and he offered his resignation.

University of Maryland University College
In April 2016, University of Maryland University College announced that Smith had been appointed to a two-year term as the Orkand Endowed Chair and Professor of Innovative Practices in Higher Education.  In this position, Smith is responsible for identifying and implementing measures to improve delivery of the school's learning and support services.

Later career
Smith was one of thirty former Republican congressmen to sign a letter opposing Donald Trump's candidacy for president. In 2021, he published a book about the American system of higher education.

Family
He is the older brother of former state representative Charles Plympton Smith.

References

Bibliography
 Smith, Peter P. (1982) Your Hidden Credentials: the Value of learning Outside College
 Smith, Peter P. (2004) The Quiet Crisis : How Higher Education is Failing America. Anker 

|-

|-

|-

1945 births
20th-century American politicians
20th-century American educators
American officials of the United Nations
California Republicans
California State University, Monterey Bay
Harvard Graduate School of Education alumni
Heads of universities and colleges in the United States
Lieutenant Governors of Vermont
Living people
Phillips Academy alumni
Politicians from Boston
Politicians from Burlington, Vermont
Princeton University alumni
Republican Party members of the United States House of Representatives from Vermont
Vermont state senators
UNESCO officials
University of Maryland Global Campus faculty